Shane William Rawley (born July 27, 1955) is a former Major League Baseball pitcher. He played all or part of twelve seasons in the majors, from 1978 through 1989, for the Seattle Mariners, New York Yankees, Philadelphia Phillies, and Minnesota Twins.

Rawley was selected to the National League All-Star team in 1986 as a member of the Phillies. The next year, he won a career high 17 games, leading the NL in games started with 36. In his major league career, Rawley's record was 111-118, with 991 strikeouts and a 4.02 earned run average (ERA).

Personal life
After retiring from baseball, he has owned Shaner's Pizzeria in Sarasota, Florida.

References

External links

Shane Rawley at Baseball Almanac

1955 births
Living people
National League All-Stars
Minnesota Twins players
New York Yankees players
Philadelphia Phillies players
Seattle Mariners players
Major League Baseball pitchers
Baseball players from Wisconsin
Sportspeople from Racine, Wisconsin
Gulf Coast Expos players
West Palm Beach Expos players
Spokane Indians players
Kinston Expos players
Quebec Metros players
Sportspeople from the Milwaukee metropolitan area